José Martí y Monsó (4 January 1840, Valencia - 14 December 1912, Valladolid) was a Spanish painter, art professor, researcher and museum official. He was considered an expert on Castilian art and the history of Holy Week in Valladolid.

Biography
After 1860, he was a regular participant in the National Exhibition of Fine Arts. In 1864, he won honorable mention for his depiction of an episode from the Esquilache Riots, followed by a third class medal in 1866 for his work "The Grape Harvest".

After 1873, he combined his work as an artist with the role of professor when he became Director of the "Escuela de Artes y Oficios de Valladolid". In 1900, he was elected a member of the "Real Academia de Bellas Artes de la Purísima Concepción".

He was also the author of Catálogo provisional del Museo de Pintura y Escultura de Valladolid (1874) and Estudios histórico-artísticos relativos a Valladolid (1898-1901). A plaza in Valladolid has been named in his honor.

References

External links 

Works by Martí @ the Biblioteca Digital de Castilla y León
Catálogo provisional del Museo de Pintura y Escultura de Valladolid,  Full text @ Google Books.

1840 births
1912 deaths
19th-century Spanish painters
19th-century Spanish male artists
Spanish male painters
Spanish genre painters
Spanish art historians
People from Valencia
Directors of museums in Spain
Real Academia de Bellas Artes de San Fernando alumni